Cláudio Camunguelo (June 5, 1947 – December 24, 2007) was a Brazilian flautist, dancer, composer and singer/improviser of samba and choro . His compositions were used by several of the more famous sambistas and choro artists including Zeca Pagodinho.

External links
Camunguelo at Answers.com
|Cláudio Camunguelo at Samba-Choro.com

1947 births
2007 deaths
Brazilian male dancers
Samba musicians
Brazilian composers
20th-century Brazilian dancers
21st-century Brazilian dancers
20th-century Brazilian musicians
21st-century Brazilian musicians